Boban Zirintusa Bogere (born 2 February 1992) is a Ugandan professional footballer who plays as a midfielder for Mtibwa in Tanzania Premier League and for the Uganda national team.

Boban has previously played in Vipers and Simba in Tanzania, Mtibwa Sugar in Tanzania, Dynamos and Highfield in Zimbabwe, Polokwane City in South Africa, Buildcon in Zambia and Ethiopian Coffee in Ethiopia.

Club career

Vipers
Boban arrived at the club in 2006 mid-season on a crisis landing. He was signed by Coach Charles Ayiekoh to strengthen the team at a time of fighting relegation during Vipers maiden season in the top flight league. He was part of that historical team which survived relegation by a thread following a 4-1 drubbing of Kampala United in a second last match to the 2006 league closer before leaving Vipers in 2008.

Dynamos
He joined Dynamos from Highfield F.C. in January 2013.
Boban Zirintusa scored on his Dynamos debut as the Harare giants cruised to an easy Champions League preliminary round first leg victory over Lesotho Correctional Services F.C  at Rufaro stadium. Boban came on as a substitute for Tichaona Mabvura in the 68th minute.

Polokwane City
Boban joined Polokwane city F.C  in October 2014 from Dynamos. Boban who was a second-half substitute, netted his first strike on his debut for Polokwane after an assist by Esau Kanyenda in the 47th minute to help Polokwane City stop Bidvest Wits 2–0 in an ABSA League.

Buildcon
On  24 July 2017, Zirintusa agreed terms with Zambian club Buildcon Football club and joined them.

Ethiopian Coffee Sports Club 
In January 2018, Boban joined Ethiopian Coffee Sports Club.

Kirinya–Jinja Senior Secondary School
In September 2019, he joined Kirinya–Jinja Senior Secondary School FC. He made his debut against Bul FC.

Mtibwa
In January 2020, Boban rejoined  Mtibwa.

International career
Boban passed through national football team set ups, he played for Uganda U20, Uganda U23 up to the senior team, however he made his senior national team  debut during the 2014 Brazil World Cup qualifiers Uganda against Liberia, on 24 March 2013 at Samuel K.Doe Sports Stadium in Monrovia.

Honours
Dynamos 
 Zimbabwe Premier Soccer League: 2013
 Zimbabwean Independence Trophy: 2013

Uganda
 CECAFA Cup: 2009, 2013

References

External links
 africanfootball.com
 worldfootball.com
 
 

1992 births
Living people
Ugandan footballers
Uganda international footballers
Association football midfielders
Ugandan expatriate footballers
Expatriate soccer players in South Africa
Expatriate footballers in Zambia
Expatriate footballers in Tanzania
Expatriate footballers in Zimbabwe
Expatriate footballers in Ethiopia
SC Villa players
Ugandan expatriate sportspeople in South Africa
Ugandan expatriate sportspeople in Zambia
Ugandan expatriate sportspeople in Tanzania
Ugandan expatriate sportspeople in Zimbabwe
Ugandan expatriate sportspeople in Ethiopia
Buildcon F.C. players
Mtibwa Sugar F.C. players
Tanzanian Premier League players
People from Jinja District